Beauty from Pain is the fourth album released by the band Superchick.  This is the first CD the band has released with an official drummer, Brandon Estelle.  Christian rapper and hip-hop singer tobyMac appears in the song "Stories (Down to the Bottom)", which is also heard on his CD Welcome to Diverse City.

Track listing

Beauty from Pain 1.1 
Beauty From Pain was released again in July 2006 as Beauty From Pain 1.1.  This is Superchick's mainstream debut album with Columbia Records.  It is different from the original in that the track order was also slightly rearranged. It features remixed versions of "We Live", and "Anthem", does not include "Stories", and includes Regeneration's "One Girl Revolution".

A new track, "Stand in the Rain", was included on this re-release.  The song reached No. 1 on the R&R Christian Hit Radio (CHR) chart for 9 weeks starting in October 2006. It was the 18th most played song on CHR radio stations in 2007.

Track listing

Awards 

In 2006, the album was nominated for a Dove Award for Rock Album of the Year at the 37th GMA Dove Awards.

References 

2005 albums
Superchick albums
Inpop Records albums
Garage rock revival albums
Pop punk albums by American artists